In mathematics, in graph theory, the Seidel adjacency matrix of a simple undirected graph G is a symmetric matrix with a row and column for each vertex, having 0 on the diagonal, −1 for positions whose rows and columns correspond to adjacent vertices, and +1 for positions corresponding to non-adjacent vertices.
It is also called the Seidel matrix or—its original name—the (−1,1,0)-adjacency matrix. 
It can be interpreted as the result of subtracting the adjacency matrix of G from the adjacency matrix of the complement of G.

The multiset of eigenvalues of this matrix is called the Seidel spectrum. 

The Seidel matrix of G is also the adjacency matrix of a signed complete graph KG in which the edges of G are negative and the edges not in G are positive.  It is also the adjacency matrix of the two-graph associated with G and KG.

The eigenvalue properties of the Seidel matrix are valuable in the study of strongly regular graphs.

References
 van Lint, J. H., and Seidel, J. J. (1966), Equilateral point sets in elliptic geometry.  Indagationes Mathematicae, vol. 28 (= Proc. Kon. Ned. Aka. Wet. Ser. A, vol. 69), pp. 335–348.
 Seidel, J. J. (1976), A survey of two-graphs.  In: Colloquio Internazionale sulle Teorie Combinatorie (Proceedings, Rome, 1973), vol. I, pp. 481–511.  Atti dei Convegni Lincei, No. 17.  Accademia Nazionale dei Lincei, Rome.
Seidel, J. J. (1991), ed. D.G. Corneil and R. Mathon, Geometry and Combinatorics: Selected Works of J. J. Seidel.  Boston: Academic Press.  Many of the articles involve the Seidel matrix.
Seidel, J. J. (1968), Strongly Regular Graphs with (−1,1,0) Adjacency Matrix Having Eigenvalue 3. Linear Algebra and its Applications 1, 281–298.

Algebraic graph theory
Matrices